Manuvāda (also Manuvād, Manuwād, Hindi मनुवाद) is the ethos of a society governed by Manusmṛti. Manuvādi is a proponent of such an ethos.  

In contemporary discourse, these terms (especially the latter) are often used oppositionally for contrasting their positions, interests, and viewpoints with a society that is informed by and/or identifies with Manuvāda, particularly with respect to caste.

The term came to the fore in the politics of India in the early 2000s, during the government of the nationalist Bharatiya Janata Party. The term came to be used for the allegation of a hidden agenda of the nationalist parties by their opponents, for example, in 2003, Uttar Pradesh Chief Minister Mayawati remarked that "the Lok Sabha had been taken over by Manuvadi forces".

References

Shashi Shekhar Sharma, Imagined Manuvād: the Dharmaśāstras and their interpreters, Rupa & Co., 2005

See also
Caste politics in India
Sanatani
Hindu law
Classical Hindu law

Hindu law
Hindu nationalism